John Joseph (15 November 1932 – 6 May 1998) was the Roman Catholic Bishop of Faisalabad from 1984–1998 and is best known for committing suicide to protest the cruel treatment of Christians in Pakistan.

Life 
John Joseph was born in Khushpur, Pakistan. He received his religious education at the Christ the King Seminary in Karachi and was ordained in Faisalabad on 18 January 1960. After completing a doctorate he went on to serve on the faculty of the Christ the King Seminary. On 24 October 1980 he was appointed Auxiliary Bishop of Faisalabad and ordained Bishop on 9 January 1981.  On 9 January 1984 he became Bishop of Faisalabad. He committed suicide by shooting himself on 6 May 1998, in protest at the execution of a Christian man on trumped up blasphemy charges by Muslims in Pakistan.

After death 
Three new publications on Bishop John Joseph have been published since the bishop's death. "A Peaceful Struggle" is a compilation of the bishop's writings on matters related to justice and peace. The 197-page book was compiled by the Faisalabad diocesan human rights office, led by Father Khalid Rashid Asi. A translation of the English-language book into Urdu has also been published.
The third book, "Sermons in Blood," is a 110-page book written by labor activist Gulzar Wafa Chaudhry. Chaudhry attempts to keep alive the revolutionary spirit that Bishop Joseph tried to initiate in protest at the situation of Christians and other religious minority communities in Pakistan.

A film showing Bishop John Joseph's struggles for minority rights was screened  at the South Asian film festival in Kathmandu October 4–7, 2001. The 45-minute documentary "A Sun Sets in" was produced by Waseem Anthony and showed the life of the late Bishop, the first Punjabi bishop, and his struggle for Pakistani Catholics.

The Bishop John Joseph Memorial Hall in Darulaloom Jamia Rehmania madrassa in Faisalabad, was inaugurated on March 31, 2007. Bishop Joseph Coutts was present during the opening. No other Islamic seminary in the country has a building named after a Catholic priest.

On Bishop John Joseph's advice Mr. Aftab Alexander Mughal and Mr. Peter Jacob wrote a book, Section 295 C, Pakistan Penal Code – Study of the History, Effects and Cases under Blasphemy Laws in Pakistan, which was published in 1995.

References

External links
 Bishop John Joseph

1932 births
1998 deaths
20th-century Roman Catholic bishops in Pakistan
People from Khushpur
Suicides by firearm in Pakistan
Protest-related deaths
Blasphemy law in Pakistan
1998 suicides
Roman Catholic bishops of Faisalabad